Kathryn Lee Gifford (née Epstein; born August 16, 1953) is a French-born American television presenter, singer, songwriter, actress and author. From 1985 to 2000, she and Regis Philbin hosted the talk show Live! with Regis and Kathie Lee. Gifford is also known for her 11-year run with Hoda Kotb, on the fourth hour of NBC's Today show (2008–2019). She has received 11 Daytime Emmy nominations and won her first Daytime Emmy in 2010 as part of the Today team.

Gifford's first television role was as Tom Kennedy's singer/sidekick on the syndicated version of Name That Tune in the 1977–1978 season. She also occasionally appeared on the first three hours of Today and was a contributing NBC News correspondent.

Kathie Lee married Paul Johnson, a composer, arranger, producer and publisher of Christian music, in 1976. After their divorce in 1982, she married sportscaster and former NFL player Frank Gifford in 1986. He died in 2015. Kathie Lee has released studio music albums and several books.

Early life and beginnings
Gifford was born Kathryn Lee Epstein in Paris, France, to American parents, Joan (born Cuttell; January 20, 1930 – September 12, 2017), a singer and Aaron Epstein (March 19, 1924 – November 19, 2002), a musician and former US Navy Chief Petty Officer. Aaron Epstein was stationed with his family in France at the time of Gifford's birth. Gifford grew up in Bowie, Maryland, and attended Bowie High School.

Gifford's paternal grandfather was a Russian Jew from Saint Petersburg and her paternal grandmother had Native American ancestry. Her mother, a relative of writer Rudyard Kipling, was of French Canadian, German and English descent.

After seeing the Billy Graham produced film The Restless Ones at age 12, Gifford became a born-again Christian. She told interviewer Larry King, "I was raised with many Jewish traditions and raised to be very grateful for my Jewish heritage."

During high school, Gifford was a singer in a folk group, "Pennsylvania Next Right", which performed frequently at school assemblies.  After high school graduation in 1971, Gifford attended Oral Roberts University in Tulsa, Oklahoma, studying drama and music. During a summer in the early 1970s, she was a live-in secretary/babysitter for Anita Bryant at her home in Miami. Her first regular appearances on national TV was as a singer on the game show "Name That Tune," hosted by Tom Kennedy in the late 1970s, in which she would sing small portions of songs that contestants would have to identify.

Career

Early career

Gifford's career took off in the 1970s as a vocalist on the game show Name That Tune with Tom Kennedy. In 1978, she joined the cast of the short-lived Hee Haw spinoff, Hee Haw Honeys.  She was also a correspondent and substitute anchor on ABC's Good Morning America in the early 1980s.

Live! with Regis and Kathie Lee
On June 24, 1985, Gifford replaced Ann Abernathy as co-host of The Morning Show on WABC-TV with Regis Philbin. The program went into national broadcast in 1988 as Live! with Regis and Kathie Lee, and Gifford became well known across the country. Throughout the 1990s, morning-TV viewers watched her descriptions of life at home with her sportscaster husband Frank, son Cody, and daughter Cassidy.

In 1990, when TV Guide held a poll for readers to select the most beautiful woman on television, Live! presented a week-long mock campaign to garner votes for Gifford. Gifford wound up winning the poll, receiving more than four times as many votes as the runners-up, Jaclyn Smith and Nicollette Sheridan.

Philbin and Gifford were jointly nominated eight consecutive years in a row (1993 to 2000) for Outstanding Talk Show Host during the Daytime Emmy Awards. Gifford left the show on July 28, 2000.

Today with Kathie Lee and Hoda
On March 31, 2008, NBC announced that Gifford was to join its morning show, Today, as co-host of the fourth hour titled Today with Kathie Lee and Hoda, alongside Hoda Kotb. This marked her return to morning television; in many markets, she aired directly after her old show, currently called Live with Kelly and Ryan. Because the fourth hour of Today airs live at 10:00 am ET, and Live with Kelly and Ryan airs live at 9:00 am ET, Gifford's hour did not compete directly with her former show in most markets. Kotb and Gifford replaced Ann Curry and Natalie Morales. In the weeks prior to Gifford's arrival, ratings indicated 1.9 million viewers of the fourth hour of Today.  As of 2014, the fourth hour of Today with Gifford and Kotb has averaged 2.15 million total viewers, an increase of 13 percent over the 2008 ratings.  On December 11, 2018, it was announced that she would be leaving Today in April 2019. Her final Today Show appearance was on April 5, 2019, with a party, including a video by her children Cody and Cassidy Gifford. In 2019, they won the Daytime Emmy Award for Outstanding Informative Talk Show Host.

Other media appearances and projects

Gifford has made guest appearances in films and television series, and has several independently released albums on CD, including 2000's The Heart of a Woman, featuring the single "Love Never Fails".

She appeared as a spokesperson for Slim Fast diet shakes after her son Cody was born. She also was the face of Carnival Cruise Lines in the late 1980s and early 1990s, singing "If my friends could see me now!" In 1991 she christened the Carnival Ecstasy, the 2nd of the Fantasy Class of cruise ships. In 1994, she appeared as herself in an episode of the NBC sitcom Seinfeld.

She did a number of voice overs most notably as Echidna in the 1998 TV series Hercules and in Higglytown Heroes as the Mail Carrier Hero in 2004.

In September 2005 she became a special correspondent on The Insider, a syndicated entertainment magazine television show, ending her relationship with that program upon her co-hosting role with Today.

She played the role of Miss Hannigan in a concert performance of Annie at Madison Square Garden in December 2006.

On an episode that aired March 27, 2010, she guest starred on The Suite Life on Deck, along with her real-life daughter, Cassidy.

She appeared as herself in the 2015 television film Sharknado 3: Oh Hell No!.

She has written numerous autobiographical books, Just When I Thought I'd Dropped my Last Egg: Life and Other Calamities in 2010, The Rock, the Road and the Rabbi in March 2018, and It’s Never Too Late: Make the Next Act of Your Life the Best Act of Your Life in 2020. Her book regarding the Christian faith, The Jesus I Know: Honest Conversations and Diverse Opinions about Who He Is was released in 2021. She has also written a number of children's books.

Current career 
Gifford left Today in order to pursue a movie career as an actress, director, and producer. In 2018, she filmed Then Came You in which she co-stars with Craig Ferguson. That same year, she also filmed a Hallmark Christmas movie for Hallmark Movies & Mysteries called A Godwink Christmas. Gifford intends to make movies about the experiences of losing a loved one and being a widow, which she considers an underrepresented topic in Hollywood. Gifford has several projects in the works including sequels to Then Came You.

On April 28, 2021, Gifford was honored with a star on the Hollywood Walk of Fame for her contributions to the television industry. Her star is located at 6834 Hollywood Boulevard, only five stars away from that of her former co-host Regis Philbin.

Musical theatre
In the late 1990s, Gifford began working in musical theatre. She contributed a number of musical numbers to Hats, and wrote and produced Under The Bridge, based upon the children's book The Family Under The Bridge by Natalie Savage Carlson. In 2000 she released the album The Heart of a Woman on Universal.

Gifford wrote the book and lyrics for Saving Aimee, a stage musical about evangelist Aimee McPherson, which premiered in 2007 at the Signature Theatre in Arlington, Virginia. The premiere starred actress Carolee Carmello in the lead role. The show, retitled as Scandalous: The Life and Trials of Aimee Semple McPherson, ran on Broadway from November 15, 2012, through December 9, 2012, with Carmello reprising her role as McPherson. On April 30, 2013,  Carmello received her third Tony Award nomination for the performance.

On April 16, 2007, Gifford was a guest presenter at the Washington, D.C. Helen Hayes Award Ceremony, honoring contributions and professional accomplishments in theatre.

In 2008, Gifford and David Friedman wrote a junior high school musical entitled Key Pin It Real. The play depicts a coming-of-age story about a young girl named Key Pin. The first production took place in December 2008 in Kendallville, Indiana, at East Noble High School.

Gifford is currently working on a musical adaptation of It's a Wonderful Life with John McDaniel; McDaniel is composing music while Gifford is writing lyrics.

Other endeavors

Charity
Gifford is a celebrity ambassador for the non-profit organization Childhelp. She regularly makes appearances at fund raisers and events for the child abuse prevention and treatment organization and is an ardent supporter.

Frank and Kathie Lee Gifford raised the money to build and continued to financially support two shelters in New York City for babies born with HIV, or a congenital crack cocaine addiction. These shelters were named in honor of her children, Cody and Cassidy.

Labor rights activity
In 1996 Gifford was earning $9 million annually licensing her name to a brand of clothing sold at Walmart. Part of the proceeds went to charity. Charles Kernaghan's  human rights group called the National Labor Committee reported that sweatshop labor was being used in manufacturing the Kathie Lee Gifford branded clothing.

Gifford called Kernaghan's report  "a vicious attack" on a TV broadcast called Live! with Regis and Kathie Lee. Gifford explained during this broadcast that she was not responsible for the contract manufacturers that made her products.

Kernaghan in his congressional testimony of April 1996, said that to make Gifford's clothing, girls as young as 15 worked for 31 cents an hour, 75 hours a week. Kernaghan reported that a worker in Honduras smuggled a piece of clothing out of the factory, which had a Kathie Lee label on it. One of the workers, Wendy Diaz, came to the United States to testify about the conditions under which she worked. She commented, "I wish I could talk to [Kathie Lee]. If she's good, she will help us."

Gifford later contacted federal authorities to investigate the issue and worked with US federal legislative and executive branch agencies to support and enact laws to protect children against sweatshop conditions. She appeared with President Bill Clinton at the White House in support of the government's initiatives to counter international sweatshop abuses.

Personal life

Kathie Lee married Paul Johnson, a composer/arranger/producer/publisher, in 1976. They gained fame in Christian music, appearing on covers of Christian magazines. The marriage was strained from the start and in 1981, Johnson moved out of their residence in Woodland Hills, CA. The couple divorced in 1982.

On October 18, 1986, Kathie Lee married a second time, this time to Frank Gifford, an American football player and television sports commentator. It was his third marriage after marriages with Maxine Avis Ewart and Astrid Lindley. With Ewart he had three children.

Kathie Lee was 23 years younger than Frank. They had two children together, Cody Newton Gifford (born March 22, 1990) and Cassidy Erin Gifford (born August 2, 1993). They also shared a birthday:  August 16. Frank died on August 9, 2015, from natural causes at their Greenwich, Connecticut, home at the age of 84. In 2017, she released "He Saw Jesus", a very personal song Kathie Lee co-wrote (with songwriter Brett James) and dedicated to her husband. All proceeds from the song went to the international evangelical Christian humanitarian aid charity Samaritan's Purse.

Discography
(as Kathie Lee Gifford on all albums except where indicated)
1978: Finders Keepers (as Kathie Lee Johnson)
1993: It's Christmas Time
1993: Christmas Carols
1993: Sentimental
1993: Christmas With Kathie Lee Gifford (double album)
1995: Dreamship: Lullabies for Little Ones
1995: Kathie Lee's Rock 'N' Tots Cafe: A Christmas "Giff"
2000: Heart of a Woman (as Kathie Lee)
2000: Born For You (as Kathie Lee)
2001: Goodnight, Angel (as Kathie Lee)
2004: Gentle Grace
2009: Everyone Has a Story (as Kathie Lee Gifford & Friends)
2009: My Way Home
2010: Super Hits
2013: Scandalous, The Musical (lyrics by)
2017: The Little Giant
2020: Then Came You (Original Motion Picture Soundtrack with Brett James & Sal Oliveri)

Filmography
Credits from Kathie Lee Gifford IMDb page.

Actress
Days of Our Lives: Nurse Callahan (1978, credited as Kathie Lee Johnson)
Hee Haw Honeys: Kathie Honey (1978-1979, credited as Kathie Lee Johnson)
Evening Shade: Stephanie Rodgers (1994, 1 episode)
Seinfeld: (1994, 1 episode)
Coach: (1995, 1 episode)
The Cosby Mysteries: (1995, 1 episode)
Women of the House: (1995, 1 episode)
The First Wives Club: (1996, Movie)
Second Noah: (1997, 1 episode)
Mother Goose: A Rappin' and Rhymin' Special: Jill (1997, TV Movie: Voice)
Happily Ever After: Fairy Tales for Every Child: Jill (1997, 1 episode: Voice)
Spin City: (1997, 1 episode)
The Tom Show: (1997, 1 episode)
Honey, I Shrunk the Kids: The TV Show: (1997, 1 episode)
Style & Substance: (1998, 1 episode)
Diagnosis Murder: Mary Montgomery (1998, 1 episode)
Soul Men: (1998, 1 episode)
Caroline in the city: (1998, 1 episode)
The Simpsons: (1998, 1 episode: Voice)
Hercules: Echidna (1998, 4 episodes: Voice)
LateLine: (1999, 1 episode)
Hercules: Her to Zero (1999, Direct-to-VHS release: Voice)
Dudley Do-Right (1999, Movie)
Hey Arnold!: Jackie Lee (1999, 1 episode: Voice)
The Famous Jett Jackson (1999, 1 episode)
The Wonderful World of Disney: Dierdre (2000, 1 episode: Voice)
Touched by an Angel: Wendy/Jolene (1996-2000, 2 episodes)
The Amanda Show: Princess Whiff (2001, 1 episode)
Spinning Out of Control: Amanda Berkley (2001, TV Movie)
Just Shoot Me!: Allison Spencer (2001, 1 episode)
The Drew Carey Show: Vanessa Bobeck (2001, 1 episode)
Hope & Faith: Marge (2004, 1 episode)
Higglytown Heroes: Mail Carrier (2004-2005, 2 episodes)
That's So Raven: Claire (2005, 1 episode)
Handy Manny: Mrs. Hillary (2006, 1 episode)
Lipstick Jungle: (2009, 1 episode)
30 Rock: (2010, 1 episode)
The Suite Life on Deck (2010, 1 episode)
Adventures of Serial Buddies (2011, Movie)
Hot in Cleveland: Christal (2011, 1 episode)
The Mysteries of Laura (2015, 1 episode)
Sharknado 3: Oh Hell No!: (2015, TV Movie)
Difficult People: (2015, 1 episode)
Donny!: (2015, 2 episodes)
Come to the Garden: Reader/Singer (2016, Movie: Voice)
Younger: (2016, 1 episode)
Nashville: (2017,1 episode)
Sharknado 5: Global Warming: (2017, TV Movie)
Girlfriends' Guide to Divorce: (2014-2017, 3 episodes)
A Godwink Christmas: Aunt Jane (2018, TV Movie)
The Baxters: Lillian (2019, 3 episodes)
The Other Two: (2019, 1 episode)
A Godwink Christmas: Meant for Love: Olga (2019, TV Movie)
Then Came You (2020)

Producer
Kathie Lee Gifford's Celebration of Motherhood (1993)
Kathie Lee's Rock n' Tots Cafe: A Christmas "Giff" (1995)
A Godwink Christmas (2018)
The God Who Sees (2019)
A Godwink Christmas: Meant for Love (2019)
Then Came You (2020)

Herself
The $100,000 Name That Tune (1977)
Constantinople (1977)
The Funniest Joke I Ever Heard (1984)
Miss America (1985)
The New Hollywood Squares (1987)
Regis and Kathie Lee: Special Edition (1988)
The Pat Sajak Show (1988)
The Morning Exchange (1989)
Hee Haw (1989)
Donahue (1990)
Children's Miracle Network Telethon (1990)
Victory & Valor: Special Olympics World Games (1991)
Walt Disney World's 20th Celebration (1991)
The Bikini Open 5 (1991)
All My Children (1991)
ABC After School Special (1992)
Kathie Lee Gifford's Celebration of Motherhood (1993)
A Musical Christmas at Walt Disney World (1993)
The Crusaders (1994)
Glenn Miller's Greatest Hits (1994)
The Annual Friars Club Tribute Presents a Salute to Barbara Walters (1994)
All-Star 25th Birthday: Stars and Street Forever! (1994)
The 10th TV Academy Hall of Fame (1994)
Walt Disney World Inside Out (1994)
CBS This Morning (1994)
1994 Holiday at Pops! (1994)
Kathie Lee Gifford...Looking for Christmas (1994)
Kathie Lee's Rock n' Tots Cafe: A Christmas "Giff" (1995)
Intimate Portrait (1995)
Super Bowl XXIX (1995)
Regis and Kathie Lee: Mom's Dream Come True (1995)
Miss North America (1995)
Kathie Lee's Rock n' Tots Cafe: Kathie Lee's Big Surprise (1996)
The Fresh Prince of Bel-Air (1996)
The Line King: The Al Hirschfeld Story (1996)
Maury (1992-1996)
Kathie Lee Gifford: We Need a Little Christmas (1996)
Kathie Lee Gifford: Just in Time for Christmas (1996)
Oops! The World's Funniest Outtakes 5 (1997)
The 25th Annual Daytime Emmy's (1998)
Biography (1996-1998)
Wheel of Fortune (1999)
Millennium Chorus: The Greatest Story Ever Sung (2000)
31st Annual Gospel Music Association's Dove Awards (2000)
The 27th Annual Daytime Emmy's (2000)
The 54th Annual Tony Awards (2001)
Late Night with Conan O'Brien (2001)
The 28th Annual Daytime Emmy's (2001)
AFI Life Achievement Award: A Tribute to Barbra Streisand (2001)
ESPN SportsCentury (2001)
Primetime Glick (2001)
See How They Run (2001)
The Rosie O'Donnell Show (1996-2002)
Late Show with David Letterman (1993-2002)
Star Search (2003)
The Wayne Brady Show (2003)
The Ellen DeGeneres Show (2003)
The Jamie Kennedy Experiment (2003-2004)
Hollywood Squares (2000-2004)
Controversy (2004)
Good Day Live (2005)
The Tony Danza Show (2004-2005)
The Daily Buzz (2005)
Larry King Live (2000-2006)
The Reichen Show (2006)
The O'Reilly Factor (2008)
Celebrity Family Feud (2008)
Books Equal Gifts Commercial (2008)
Plymouth Rock Studios: The Series (2009)
Jimmy Kimmel Live (2004-2009)
VH1 Divas Live 2009 (2009)
Talk Stoop (2011)
CMT: 40 Greatest Love Songs (2011)
The Annual 2011 Actors Fund Gala Awards (2011)
Keeping Up With the Kardashians (2011)
Live With Kelly and Ryan (1998-2011)
The Lennon Sisters: Same Song, Separate Voices (2011)
The Apprentice (2009-2012)
The Soup (2012)
The Wendy Williams Show (2012)
Weekend Today (2012)
2012 CMT Music Awards (2012)
The Daily Show (2011-2012)
Theater Talk (2013)
Chelsea Lately (2013)
Steve Harvey (2013)
Chasing the Saturdays (2013)
Late Night with Jimmy Fallon (2009-2013)
After Lately (2013)
Smash (2013)
Who Wants to be a Millionaire? (2013)
Kris (2013)
Top Chef Masters (2013)
The Real Story with Gretchen Carlson (2013)
The Tonight Show with Jay Leno (1994-2013)
Bethenny (2014)
Late Night with Seth Meyers (2014)
The Michael J. Fox Show (2014)
The View (2004-2014)
Howard Stern Birthday Bash (2014)
Dateline NBC (2014)
Rachael Ray (2006-2014)
WWE Raw (2014)
The Insider (2006-2014)
The JBL & Cole Show with Renee Young (2014)
Inside Edition! (2014)
A Toast to 2014! (2014)
73 Questions (2015)
Whose Line is it Anyway? (2015)
The Kitchen (2015)
Minimalism: A Documentary About the Important Things (2015)
Good Morning America (2015)
The Meredith Vieira Show (2015-2016)
A Toast to 2016! (2016)
Girlfriend's Guide to Divorce (2017)
Home & Family (2017)
Talking Live with Dr. Robi Ludwig (2017)
The National Christmas Tree Lighting (2017)
Paula Abdul/Today Show (2017)
Billy Graham: An Extraordinary Journey (2018)
Access Hollywood (2018)
Today Show: An Insider's Guide to Italy (2018)
Harry (2018)
Megyn Kelly Today (2018)
The Tonight Show Starring Jimmy Fallon (2019)
Extra with Billy Bush (2014-2019)
Entertainment Tonight (2003-2019)
The Dr. Oz Show (2015-2020)
Celebrity Page (2017-2020)
Today Show (2004-2020)

Written works

Biographical
1976: (As Kathie Epstein) The Quiet Riot
1992: I Can't Believe I Said That!: An Autobiography by Kathie Lee Gifford
1995: Listen to My Heart: Lessons in Love, Laughter, and Lunacy 
2010: Just When I Thought I'd Dropped My Last Egg: Life and Other Calamities
2014: Good Gifts: One Year in the Heart of a Home
2018: The Rock, the Road and the Rabbi
2020: It’s Never Too Late: Make the Next Act of Your Life the Best Act of Your Life

Cooking
1993: (with Regis Philbin) Cooking With Regis & Kathie Lee: Quick & Easy Recipes From America's Favorite TV Personalities
1994: (with Regis Philbin) Entertaining With Regis & Kathie Lee: Year-Round Holiday Recipes, Entertaining Tips, and Party Ideas

Christian faith
2004: Gentle Grace: Reflections & Scriptures on God’s Gentle Grace
2021: The Jesus I Know: Honest Conversations and Diverse Opinions about Who He Is
2022: (with Rabbi Jason Sobel) The God of the Way: A Journey into the Stories, People, and Faith That Changed the World Forever

Children's books
1997: Christmas with Kathie Lee: A Treasury of Holiday Stories, Songs, Poems, and Activities for Little Ones
2010: Party Animals
2011: The Three Gifts: A Story About Three Angels and the baby Jesus (co-written with Michael Storrings)
2011: The Legend of Messy M'Cheany
2018: The Gift That I Can Give
2020: Hello, Little Dreamer

In popular culture 
A fictionalized version of Kathie Lee Gifford appears in the South Park episode "Weight Gain 4000", voiced by Karri Turner. Gifford later re-appears in the episodes "City on the Edge of Forever", "The Return of Chef", "200" and "201".

See also
 New Yorkers in journalism
 Carnival Ecstasy (Sponsor)

References

External links
 
 
 
 
 Kathie Lee Gifford discography (Music City)
 Gifford interview transcript, Larry King Live, 2000 
 

1953 births
Living people
20th-century American actresses
20th-century American composers
20th-century American non-fiction writers
20th-century American women singers
20th-century American women writers
20th-century evangelicals
20th-century women composers
21st-century American actresses
21st-century American composers
21st-century American non-fiction writers
21st-century American women singers
21st-century American women writers
21st-century evangelicals
21st-century women composers
Actresses from Maryland
American evangelicals
American expatriates in France
American people of English descent
American people of French-Canadian descent
American people of German descent
American people of Russian-Jewish descent
American performers of Christian music
American television actresses
American television reporters and correspondents
American television talk show hosts
American women singer-songwriters
American women television journalists
American women non-fiction writers
Beauty pageant hosts
Christian music songwriters
Converts to Christianity from Judaism
Converts to evangelical Christianity
NBC News people
Olympic Games broadcasters
Oral Roberts University alumni
People from Bowie, Maryland
Singer-songwriters from Maryland